Some of the earthquakes in Haiti have been very destructive to the country. The widespread damage and high-number of casualties of events in 2010 and 2021 can be partially blamed on the fact that most of the population in Haiti resides in structures that are vulnerable to earthquake shaking, in which they are made of stone and concrete.

List of major earthquakes

See also

Enriquillo–Plantain Garden fault zone
Geology of Haiti
Lists of earthquakes

References

Sources

 
Haiti
Earthquakes
Earthquakes